Crime Monthly is a British monthly magazine published by Bauer Magazine Media UK in the genre of "true-crime" magazines. The first monthly issue carries the date April 2019, but was actually released to the markets on 7 March 2019. The magazine is subtitled Crime Monthly: The Darkest Crimes and Evil Minds. Julia Davis is the editor-in-chief and Steph Seelan the deputy editor. In addition to news, the monthly features interviews with "authors, crime insiders, experts, filmmakers, victims and psychologists to bring a new perspective on the world's most intriguing crimes and crime stories" says the launch kit. The magazine also contains a 16-page supplement of TV and entertainment reviews focusing on crime content in television, films, books and podcasts.

References

2019 establishments in the United Kingdom
Magazines established in 2019
Magazines published in London
Monthly magazines published in the United Kingdom
Bauer Group (UK)